John Woodhouse Audubon (November 30, 1812, Henderson, Kentucky – February 21, 1862, New York City) was the second son of the famed ornithologist and painter, John James Audubon. Like his father, he was primarily a painter of wildlife, but also did some portraits and genre scenes of the westward migration.

Biography
He grew up in Kentucky, Ohio and Louisiana, where he attended a school taught by his mother, Lucy. At an early age, he joined his father in his scientific pursuits, becoming an active traveler and gatherer of specimens. In 1833, they traveled to Labrador, after which his father wrote that "John has drawn a few Birds, as good as any I ever made, and in a few months I hope to give this department of my duty up to him altogether".

The following year, the family was in London. Both John and his brother, Victor Gifford Audubon (1809-1860) studied painting and made copies of works. The year 1837 saw collecting expeditions in Florida and Texas; the latter conducted from a navy cutter that had been assigned to them by President Andrew Jackson. From 1839 to 1843, he was responsible for producing a second edition of The Birds of America, overseeing the reduction of 500 plates.

Over the next few years, he created half the illustrations used for The Viviparous Quadrupeds of North America and managed the printing process. A folio size edition of The Birds of America began production in 1860, but never came to full fruition because of the Civil War. After 1839, he lived in New York City, in a house next to his father's. Throughout the 1840s and 1850s, he exhibited animal paintings and portraits at the Apollo Association, the American Art Union and the National Academy of Design.

In 1849, he joined the California Company, financed by Ambrose Kingsland, among others, and led by Colonel Henry Livingston Webb (1795–1876), a veteran of the recent Mexican–American War. They got as far as the mouth of the Rio Grande (by ship), when they were hit by cholera and some of the company's money was stolen. At that point, Webb and a dozen others resigned and John took over command. He led them across northern Mexico and Arizona and they arrived in San Diego eight months later. His paints and canvases were abandoned in the desert and he had to use his sketches for gun wadding. He spent seven months in California, but most of his watercolors were lost in transit when he shipped them to New York. Thirty-four unfinished sketches have been preserved at the Southwest Museum in Los Angeles.

He had nine children; two by his first wife, Maria Rebecca Bachman (1816–1840), daughter of John Bachman, who had been a collaborator on Quadrupeds, and seven by his second wife, Caroline Hall (1811–1899).

References

Further reading
 Peggy and Harold Samuels, The Illustrated Biographical Encyclopedia of Artists of the American West, Doubleday, 1976,

External links

 More works by Audubon at ArtNet
 John W. Audubon at Find-a-Grave

1812 births
1862 deaths
19th-century American painters
Animal painters
American naturalists
American illustrators
American watercolorists
Artists from Kentucky
People from Henderson, Kentucky